Private is a 2004 minimalist psychological drama film directed by Saverio Costanzo. A debut film by the director, the film is about a Palestinian family of seven suddenly confronted with a volatile situation in their home that in many ways reflects the larger ongoing conflict between Palestinians and Israel.

Initially selected as the official entry from Italy for the foreign language film category at the 78th Academy Awards, Private was disqualified as its main spoken language is not in Italian (a rule that was changed, effective with the next year's Oscars, partly due to this film). The film has received the Golden Leopard (best film) award at the 57th Locarno International Film Festival.

Plot
Mohammad, his wife and their five children live in a large, isolated house located halfway between a Palestinian village and an Israeli settlement. The house, in the crossfire of the two sides, is a strategic lookout point that the Israeli army decides to seize, confining the family to a few downstairs rooms in daytime and a single room at night. Mohammad refuses to leave this home and, reinforced by his principles against violence, decides to find a way to keep his family together in the house until the Israeli soldiers move on.

Main cast
 Mohammad Bakri – Mohammad B
 Lior Miller – Commander Ofer
 Hend Ayoub – Mariam B
 Tomer Russo – Private Eial
 Arin Omary – Samiah B

Reviews
 The Hollywood Reporter: "While the film is ultimately too limited in its scope to have much lingering impact, it does make for a thoughtful addition to the growing list of films dealing with the Israeli/Palestinian conflict"
 Los Angeles Times: "An appropriately and deliberately gritty, drab-looking and edgy picture" 
 New York Times: "Midnight raid by Israeli soldiers turns the home of a Palestinian family into an occupied territory in Saverio Constanzo's politically loaded allegory"
 New York Post: "The Palestinian characters are so thinly conceived that they might as well be named Victims One through Seven, and they're far more developed than the Israeli characters."
 New York Daily News: "Shot with digital cameras, "Private" has a gritty - sometimes grainy - documentary urgency that heightens the inherent tension, keeping viewers unsettled with the notion that a tragedy is always imminent."
 L.A. Weekly: "The young Italian director Saverio Costanzo puts an unnervingly intimate twist on the costs of military occupation in this aptly claustrophobic drama."
 The Times: "Saverio Costanzo’s Italian-made film adopts a stripped-down, naturalistic style to capture the tension as the squad leader proves equally fearsome to his men and the father’s angry children begin small acts of rebellion that threaten an uneasy equilibrium. Emotional and rational arguments fuel the occasionally heavy-handed script but the Israeli-Palestinian cast is strong in a film that shows how both sides are victims of violence."
 Empire: "The script is occasionally heavy-handed in laying out motivation and meaning, but excellent performances from the Israeli-Palestinian cast and a chilling moral elevate this to more than 'issue film' status. "

References

External links
 
 rottentomatoes: Private

2004 films
2004 drama films
2000s psychological drama films
Italian drama films
Italian psychological drama films
Israeli–Palestinian conflict films
Golden Leopard winners
Films directed by Saverio Costanzo